Brian Thomas Glynn (born November 23, 1967) is a German-born Canadian former professional ice hockey defenceman who played six seasons in the National Hockey League (NHL). A second round selection of the Calgary Flames, 37th overall at the 1986 NHL Entry Draft, Glynn played with the Flames, Minnesota North Stars, Edmonton Oilers, Ottawa Senators, Vancouver Canucks and Hartford Whalers during his NHL career before playing one season in the Deutsche Eishockey Liga (DEL) for Kölner Haie.

Playing career
Glynn was born in Iserlohn, West Germany while his father served in the armed forces but grew up in Saskatchewan. He played junior hockey between 1983 and 1987 with the Melville Millionaires of the Saskatchewan Junior Hockey League (SJHL) and Saskatoon Blades of the Western Hockey League (WHL). He was selected in the second round, 37th overall, by the Calgary Flames at the 1986 NHL Entry Draft.

Starting his professional career in 1987–88, Glynn made his NHL debut on October 8, 1987, and scored a goal against goaltender Glen Hanlon of the Detroit Red Wings. He appeared in 67 games as a rookie and scored 19 points. His play diminished in 1988–89, resulting in Glynn appearing in only nine games with the Flames and being demoted to the Salt Lake Golden Eagles of the International Hockey League (IHL).  He spent virtually the entire 1989–90 season with Salt Lake where he scored 61 points in 80 games.  Glynn was named a first team all-start and won the Governor's Trophy as the IHL's top defenceman.

Glynn began the 1990–91 season with Salt Lake, but joined the Minnesota North Stars on October 26, 1990, after Calgary traded him in exchange for Frank Musil. Glynn appeared in 66 regular season games with Minnesota, and in 23 playoff games as the North Stars made a Cinderella run to the 1991 Stanley Cup Final before losing to the Pittsburgh Penguins.  A journeyman defenceman, Glynn frequently changed teams over the next several seasons and ultimately was a member of seven franchises over his ten-year career.  Minnesota traded him to the Edmonton Oilers on January 21, 1992, for David Shaw.  After a year and a half in Edmonton, he was sent to the Ottawa Senators for a draft pick on September 15, 1993. But after only a half-season with the Senators, he was claimed on waivers by the Vancouver Canucks. Glynn played only 16 regular season games for Vancouver, but appeared in 17 playoff games as the Canucks reached, and lost, the 1994 Stanley Cup Final.

Glynn then spent two seasons with the Hartford Whalers and scored 11 points in 97 games combined between the 1994–95 and 1995–96 seasons. After appearing in one game for the Whalers in 1996–97 season, Glynn was involved in a significant trade between Hartford and the Detroit Red Wings.  Glynn was included in the October 9, 1996, trade that saw the Whalers also trade their captain, Brendan Shanahan, to Detroit for Paul Coffey, Keith Primeau and a first round draft pick. Glynn never played with Detroit as he was assigned to the IHL's San Antonio Dragons where he played 62 games. Glynn played a final professional season in 1997–98 in Germany, where he suited up for Kölner Haie of the Deutsche Eishockey Liga (DEL).

Career statistics

Regular season and playoffs

References

External links 

1967 births
Calgary Flames draft picks
Calgary Flames players
Canadian ice hockey defencemen
Edmonton Oilers players
German ice hockey players
Hartford Whalers players
Ice hockey people from Saskatchewan
Kölner Haie players
Living people
Minnesota North Stars players
Ottawa Senators players
Vancouver Canucks players
Canadian expatriate ice hockey players in Germany
People from Märkischer Kreis
Sportspeople from Arnsberg (region)